KYSL (93.9 FM) also known on air as Krystal 93 is a radio station broadcasting an Adult Album Alternative format. It is licensed to Frisco, Colorado, United States.  The station is currently owned by Krystal Broadcasting, Incorporated and features programming from AP Radio. KYSL transmits on 93.9 in Summit County (which includes Frisco, Dillon, Keystone, Breckenridge), 93.1 in Eagle County (Vail area), and 92.3 in Clear Creek County (Loveland Ski Area).

Krystal 93 first signed on in May 1988, and during its first 11 years on the air, the station was broadcasting an adult contemporary format. In 2001 it flipped to its current format of adult album alternative while retaining the Krystal branding and the KYSL call letters.

Krystal 93 owns the highest FM radio transmitter in North America. It is a lifestyle oriented, live radio station targeting locals and visitors who love good music and want current information (road and traffic conditions, local, regional and national news). The station also believes in a strong commitment to local non-profit organizations and events.

Krystal's online stream allows listeners all over the world to tune in.

Translators
In addition to the main station, KYSL has two translators to widen its broadcast area.

References

External links

YSL
Adult album alternative radio stations in the United States
Radio stations established in 1988
1988 establishments in Colorado